Santos Lugares is a town in the southeast of the partido of Tres de Febrero. It is part of the urban agglomeration of Greater Buenos Aires in Buenos Aires Province, northeast of the Buenos Aires city proper.

External links

 SantosLugaresweb
 Municipal website

Populated places in Buenos Aires Province
Tres de Febrero Partido
Cities in Argentina
Argentina